Super 8 is a 1994 satirical drama film written and directed by Bruce La Bruce. The film is about a failing pornographic film director who enters into a partnership with a lesbian filmmaker. It becomes clear that she has her own agenda and is exploiting him to help her succeed in her own project.

The film premiered at the 1994 Toronto International Film Festival and was shown in the midnight series at the 1994 Sundance Film Festival.

Cast
 Bruce La Bruce as Bruce and Butt Double
 Stacy Friedrich (credited as Liza LaMonica, Dirty Pillows and as Stacy Friedrich) as Googie and Jane Friday 
 Mikey Mike as Johnny Eczema 
 Nicholas Davies (credited as Klaus von Brücker) as Pierce 
 Christeen Martin (credited as Chris Teen)	as Wednesday Friday
 Kate Ashley (credited as Amy Nitrate) as Honey Velour 
 Scott Thompson as Buddy Cole

Other cast members;
 Davey Danger	as Production Assistant
 Vaginal Davis	as unnamed person	
 Gemma Files as Lady at Press Conference
 Mike Gibb as Male victim with guitar
 Rosemary Heather as Lady at Press Conference
 Hal Kelly as Lady at Press Conference
 Richard Kern	as unnamed person	
 Ben Weasel as himself

References

External links

1994 films
Alt porn
English-language Canadian films
Canadian drama films
Films set in Toronto
German LGBT-related films
Canadian LGBT-related films
German black-and-white films
Films about pornography
Films directed by Bruce LaBruce
1994 drama films
1994 LGBT-related films
LGBT-related drama films
Canadian independent films
1994 independent films
1990s English-language films
1990s Canadian films
1990s German films